Louis Fitzgerald may refer to:

 Louis Fitzgerald (general) (1838–1908)
 Louis Fitzgerald (Irish businessman), owner of the Louis Fitzgerald Group of public houses.